A by-election was held for the Australian House of Representatives seat of Warringah on 21 May 1927. This was triggered by the resignation of Nationalist MP Sir Granville Ryrie to become Australian High Commissioner to the United Kingdom.

The by-election was won by Nationalist candidate Archdale Parkhill.

Results

References

1927 elections in Australia
New South Wales federal by-elections